Colin Barton (born 17 April 1937) is a former  Australian rules footballer who played with Geelong in the Victorian Football League (VFL).

Barton was recruited from Albury in the Ovens and Murray Football League.

Brother of Bill Barton, who played with North Melbourne Football Club and George Barton who played with Hawthorn Football Club.

References

External links 

Living people
1937 births
Australian rules footballers from Victoria (Australia)
Geelong Football Club players